At the 2006 Central American and Caribbean Games the game of water polo was played by men and women. They both competed at the Complejo Acuatico U. D. Pedro de Heredia in Cartagena de Indias, Colombia from July 23 to July 29, 2006. The women participated for the first time at the Central American and Caribbean Games.

Medal summary

Men's competition

Preliminary round

July 23, 2006

July 24, 2006

July 25, 2006

July 26, 2006

July 27, 2006

Semi finals
July 28, 2006

Finals
Fifth Place Match — July 28, 2006

Bronze Medal Match — July 29, 2006

Gold Medal Match — July 29, 2006

Final ranking

Topscorers

Women's competition

Preliminary round

July 23, 2006

July 24, 2006

July 25, 2006

July 26, 2006

July 27, 2006

Semi finals
July 28, 2006

Finals
Bronze Medal Match — July 29, 2006

Gold Medal Match — July 29, 2006

Final ranking

Topscorers

References
 Results
 Official site
 

C
2006 Central American and Caribbean Games
2006